The Exam is a 2011 Hungarian drama film directed by Péter Bergendy.

Plot 
In Budapest in 1957, a year after the failure of the Hungarian uprising, Jung is a mid-level agent informing on many other citizens who come to report to him. He is in charge for an elaborate testing process to ascertain loyalty to Kádár's regime, but he does not realize that he is being watched and photographed too, by his superior and mentor, Marko.

Jung receives a visit from Eva and around the relationship between them the story unfolds.

Cast 
  as András Jung
 János Kulka as Pál Markó
 Péter Scherer as Emil Kulcsár
 Gabriella Hámori as Éva Gáti

Production
The Exam' is directed by Péter Bergendy.

References

External links 

2011 drama films
2011 films
Hungarian drama films